Don Bassman (April 2, 1927 – January 24, 1993) was an American sound engineer and VP of Special Sound Projects at 20th Century Fox. He won an Academy Award for Best Sound and was nominated for three more in the same category. He also won an Emmy Award for Eleanor and Franklin in 1976.

Selected filmography
Bassman won an Academy Award and was nominated for three more:

Won
 Patton (1970)

Nominated
 Die Hard (1988)
 The Abyss (1989)
 The Hunt for Red October (1990)

References

External links

1927 births
1993 deaths
American audio engineers
Best Sound Mixing Academy Award winners
Emmy Award winners
20th-century American engineers